Thaddeus Antonius Gerardus Maria (Geert) Reuten (born 16 April 1946 in Heerlen) is a Dutch economist and former politician. On behalf of the Socialist Party (SP) he was a senator in the First Chamber (upper house) of the Dutch parliament from June 2007 till June 2015 and again from 26 June 2018 to 11 June 2019. Reuten also teaches economics at the University of Amsterdam, and is internationally recognized as an expert on Marx and Hegel.

Reuten studied economics and sociological economics at Erasmus University Rotterdam and at Birkbeck College of the University of London. He graduated in 1988 at the University of Amsterdam (UvA). From 1977, he was lecturer and later professor at the UvA. From 2002 to 2014, he was director of the Master of Economics at the same university. His prominent work The Capitalist System is now also used as a textbook in University of Amsterdam for advanced BSc and MSc course.

He joined in Socialist Party and since that year as the economic adviser to the party in the House. In the first election in 2007 he was elected to the Senate. He was sworn in on 12 June 2007. His term ended on 9 June 2015. Reuten has also been active in the alter-association Association for the Taxation of Financial Transactions for the Aid of Citizens, ATTAC.

References 
 Amsterdam School of Economics - Dr Geert Reuten
  Parlement.com biography

1946 births
Living people
Dutch economists
Erasmus University Rotterdam alumni
Members of the Senate (Netherlands)
People from Heerlen
Socialist Party (Netherlands) politicians
Academic staff of the University of Amsterdam